Herbert or Herb Parker may refer to:

Politicians
Herbert Parker (American politician) (1856–1939), Massachusetts Attorney General
John Parker (Labour politician) (Herbert John Harvey Parker, 1906–1987), British politician

Others
Herbert Parker (health physicist) (1910–1984), British/American medical scientist
Herb Parker (1921–2007), American football coach
Herb Parker Stadium, at Minot State University, named after Herb Parker

See also
Bert Parker (disambiguation)